Valozhyn District is a second-level administrative subdivision (raion) of Belarus in the Minsk Region.

Notable residents 
Francišak Kušal (1895, Piaršai - 1969), Belarusian political and military leader

References

 
Districts of Minsk Region